Rebecca Goss (born 1974 in Suffolk) is a British poet who was nominated for the 2013 Forward Prize for Best Collection of Poetry for "Her Birth". She was one of the Poetry Book Society's 20 poets of the next generation and in 2015 was nominated for the Warwick Prize for Writing.

Bibliography
The Anatomy of Structures Flambard Press, 2010
Her Birth Carcanet Press, 2013
Carousel with Chris Routledge, Guillemot Press, 2018
Girl Carcanet Press, 2019

Award Nominations
 Forward Prize (2013)
 Warwick Prize for Writing (2015)

External links
Interview with Rebecca Goss by The Poetry Extension

References

1974 births
Living people
British women poets
21st-century English women writers